Ty Powell (born April 27, 1988) is a former American football linebacker. His hometown is Marina, California, and he attended nearby Seaside High School. After transferring from De Anza College, Powell began playing college football in 2011 at Harding in Arkansas. He was drafted in the seventh round, 231 overall by the Seattle Seahawks in the 2013 NFL Draft.

Professional career

Seattle Seahawks
He was selected by the Seattle Seahawks in the seventh round (231 overall pick) of the 2013 NFL Draft.

On September 11, 2013, Powell was signed to the Seahawks practice squad, and he was released on September 12, 2013.

New York Giants
On September 24, 2013 Powell was signed to the New York Giants.

Buffalo Bills
The Buffalo Bills signed Powell off of the Giants practice squad on October 8, 2013.  He was an active player in the 2013 and 2014 seasons.

Philadelphia Eagles
On May 17, 2016, Powell signed with the Philadelphia Eagles. On June 9, 2016, Powell announced his retirement from football.

References

External links
Harding bio
Seattle Seahawks bio

1988 births
Living people
African-American players of American football
American football linebackers
Harding Bisons football players
Seattle Seahawks players
New York Giants players
Buffalo Bills players
Philadelphia Eagles players
People from Marina, California
People from Delaware County, Oklahoma
21st-century African-American sportspeople
20th-century African-American people